The Church of St Mary the Virgin is a Church of England parish church in Huntingfield, Suffolk. The church is a grade I listed building. It is noted for its highly decorated ceiling.

History
The church dates to the Medieval period. The nave contains a 12th-century window opening. The chancel dates to the 13th or 14th century. The tower dates to the 15th century.

The arched nave ceiling is highly decorated with paintings. It was painted by Mildred Holland during the 19th century when her husband, William Holland, was the church's rector. Norman Scarfe notes that "between 1859 and 1882 that over £2,000 was spent on the church". The church was altered during the Victorian restoration in 1858 to 1859 and in 1896 to 1906.

On 7 December 1966, the church was designated a grade I listed building.

Present day

St Mary's is part of the Benefice of Heveningham with Ubbeston, Huntingfield and Cookley in the Archdeaconry of Suffolk of the Diocese of St Edmundsbury and Ipswich. The church stands in the Central tradition of the Church of England.

As the parish rejects the ordination of women, it receives alternative episcopal oversight from the Bishop of Richborough (currently Norman Banks).

References

External links
 Church website
 A Church Near You entry
 Terry Miles visits the church and plays the organ

Huntingfield
Huntingfield
Huntingfield